Diamant is a surname, and means diamond.

People with the name
 Alfred Diamant (1917–2012), American political scientist
 André Diamant (born 1990), Brazilian chess player
 Anita Diamant (born 1951), American author
 Dora Diamant (1898–1952), Polish teacher and actress associated with Franz Kafka
 Henri Diamant-Berger (1895–1972), French filmmaker
 Illana Diamant (born 1961), Israeli actress and activist
 József Diamant (1892–1975), Hungarian-born writer, also known as Joseph Bard
 Liron Diamant (born 1990), Israeli footballer
 Ruth Witt-Diamant (fl. 1931–1954), American poet and educator

See also
 Diamant (disambiguation)

References

German-language surnames